Samuel Santos may refer to:
 Samuel Santos López (born 1938), Nicaraguan politician
 Samuel Santos (footballer) (born 1990), Brazilian footballer